The following lists events that happened during 2004 in Chile.

Incumbents
President of Chile: Ricardo Lagos

Events 
28 August – A series of mudflows occur near Futrono in southern Chile.
29 November – The Valech Report is published.

Deaths
9 September – Luis Advis (b. 1935)
14 October – Juan Francisco Fresno (b. 1914)

References

 
Years of the 21st century in Chile
Chile